GaYBOR District Coalition in Historic Ybor City is a nonprofit 501(c)(6) organization located within Ybor City in Tampa, Florida. It is an organization of LGBT bars, nightclubs, restaurants, shops, nonprofit organizations, throughout the West Coast of Central Florida, with its headquarters in Historic Ybor City. The organization has many participants and is sponsored by both gay and straight members. The district is roughly centered on 8th Avenue and 15th Street in Ybor, with large rainbow flags & GaYBOR signs as markers. A yearly event around the 4th of July called "GaYBOR Days" is held in the district featuring celebrity appearances and street celebrations. Former Tampa Mayor Pam Iorio originally met with the leaders of the group on several occasions to help with planning and issues such as police protection, including that by gay and lesbian officers. Current Tampa Mayor Bob Buckhorn has met several times with the Coalition. As an organization, there are members of GaYBOR across the states of Florida and Georgia.

Tampa Bay's large LGBT community is a catalyst for this neighborhood, with a study by UCLA placing Tampa at number five in the nation for LGBT citizen population with 6.1% in the city proper and 5.9% in the metro area as a whole.

See also 
 Grand Central, a similar district near Downtown St. Pete

References

External links 
 GaYbor Official Site 

Neighborhoods in Tampa, Florida
Gay villages in Florida
Entertainment districts in Florida